Heinrich Maximilian Brückner (14 March 1836 – 2 May 1919) was a German artist and set designer.

He was born in Coburg in 1836, the son of Heinrich Brückner (1805–1892), who was the theatre painter at the Hoftheater (Court Theatre) in Coburg.

In 1870, with his younger brother Gotthold Brückner (1844–1892), he founded the Brückner Brothers Studio for Scenic Stage Design, in Coburg. They created stage sets at theatres across Germany for 40 years, most significantly at Richard Wagner's Bayreuth Festival, including the original 1876 production of Der Ring des Nibelungen.

References

1836 births
1919 deaths
German artists
People from Coburg
German scenic designers
Artists from Coburg